Georgios "Giorgos" Gkiouzelis (born October 13, 1995) is a Greek professional basketball player for Karditsa of the Greek Basket League. He is a 2.04 m (6'8") tall and 98 kg (215 lb.) power forward.

Professional career
Gkiouzelis played with the youth program of Panathinaikos before starting his pro career in 2014. From 2012 to 2017, Gkiouzelis played at the lower leagues in Greece, before joining Koroivos Amaliadas of the Greek 2nd division. The following season, he played with Diagoras Dryopideon.

In 2020, Gkiouzelis joined Iraklis Thessaloniki of the Greek Basket League. 

The following season, Gkiouzelis moved to Ionikos Nikaias. In 23 games, he averaged 5 points and 3.3 rebounds, playing around 18 minutes per contest.

On July 10, 2022, Gkiouzelis returned to Peristeri with a two-year (1+1) contract.

References

External links
 Giorgos Gkiouzelis at eurobasket.com
 Giorgos Gkiouzelis at proballers.com
 Giorgos Gkiouzelis at realgm.com

1995 births
ASK Karditsas B.C. players
Ionikos Nikaias B.C. players
Iraklis Thessaloniki B.C. players
Living people
Greek men's basketball players
Koroivos B.C. players
Basketball players from Serres
Peristeri B.C. players
Power forwards (basketball)